Caspar Austa (born 28 January 1982) is an Estonian cyclist. He competes in road racing, mountain biking, and cyclo-cross.

Major results
2006
 1st  National Cross-country Championships
2007
 2nd SEB Tartu GP
 4th Memorial Oleg Dyachenko
2009
 1st  National Cross-country Championships
2012
 2nd National Cross-country Championships
2013
 2nd National Cross-country Championships
2014
 2nd National Cross-country Championships
2015
 3rd National Cross-country Marathon Championships
2016
 2nd National Cyclo-cross Championships
2017
 3rd National Cyclo-cross Championships
2018
 3rd National Cyclo-cross Championships

References

External links

1982 births
Living people
Estonian male cyclists
Cyclo-cross cyclists
Cross-country mountain bikers
People from Elva, Estonia